Yaiza Pérez Esteve (born February 22, 1994 in Madrid) is a Spanish actress and singer. She is best known as the child actress who played Sheila in the TV series Mis Adorables Vecinos. The series also launched her singing career. As Sheila she published a single, an album, and two music videos.

As of January 2014, at the age of 19, she was playing in the theater, in a play called Aventuras en el Jurásico that was at the moment touring three cities in Spain. It was also reported that  she hadn't wanted to continue acting studies and was studying administration and company management.

Acting roles

Feature-length films  
 Sólo mía (2001, dir. by Javier Balaguer)
 The Backwoods (2006, dir. by Koldo Serra)
 Proyecto Dos (2008)

Short films 
 Corre, Adrián (2004)
 Barro

TV series 
 Hospital Central (Season 3, Episode 13, 2002)
 Paraíso (Season 3, Episode 9, 2002)
 Un lugar en el mundo (2003)
 Mis adorables vecinos (2004–2006)

Theatre plays 
 Blancanieves y los siete bajitos
 Una del oeste
 El libro de la selva

Discography 
Discography as Sheila from Mis adorables vecinos.

Albums

Singles

References

External links 
 

1994 births
Living people
Spanish film actresses
Spanish child singers
Spanish stage actresses
Spanish television actresses
Spanish telenovela actresses
Child pop musicians
Actresses from Madrid
Singers from Madrid
Esteve, Yaiza
21st-century Spanish singers
21st-century Spanish women singers
21st-century Spanish actresses
Spanish child actresses